Md. Rezaul Hasan (born December 17, 1962), also known as M R Hasan, is a judge of the High Court Division of the Bangladesh Supreme Court.

Education 
Hasan received his bachelor's degree and master's degree in law from the University of Dhaka.

Career 
Justice Hasan became a lawyer of the district court on 3 March 1985.

Hasan was also lecturer at law faculty of Chittagong University for a brief period of time.

On 17 June 1989, Hasan became a lawyer of the High Court Division of the Bangladesh Supreme Court.

Hasan became a lawyer of the Appellate Division of the Bangladesh Supreme Court on 21 July 2004.

Hasan was appointed an additional judge of the High Court Division of Bangladesh in 2009. He was made a permanent judge of the High Court Division on 6 June 2011.

Hasan was a short-term consultant at the World Bank, Dhaka Office, in 2003. He contributed an essay to the treatise Investment Across the Borders, published by International Monetary Fund from the Vienna, 2010.

His book M. R. Hasan's Index of Bangladesh Laws has been widely accepted by the legal community in Bangladesh and copies of it are preserved in the libraries of the United States Supreme Court, United States Congress, Harvard Law School, Cornell University, Yale University, Columbia University Law School, Princeton University and the University of Chicago.

Hasan was the keynote speaker in a seminar on commercial law jointly organised by Standard Chartered Bangladesh and the United Nations Development Programme in Dhaka in July 2018. In this seminar, he advocated to reduce the bank interest rate to below 10%. Justice Hasan was also a keynote speaker in a webinar on the Development Plans of Bangabandhu and the Present Day Realities organised by Dhaka WASA from California, on 14 August 2021, in commemoration of the birth centenary of Sheikh Mujibur Rahman. Hasan's article, The Liberation War 1971: Its Legitimacy Under the International Law, written as a tribute to Rahman and published in a Special Magazine of the RAB and other reputed journals in 2020, has brought forth new insights about the war of liberation of Bangladesh.

The Bangladesh Securities and Exchange Commission has amended its Listing Registrations in 2014 as per direction given in a judgment from Hasan that requires the listed companies to hold an annual general meeting in the cities of their registered offices. This has increased transparency in the capital markets. Hasan's judgment directing that no school teacher shall be kept under suspension for more than two months has greatly reduced victimisation of teachers since the Ministry of Education published a circular about compliance with the judgment.

Hasan's judgment on a gang rape case was published in the Leading Cases of India Pakistan and Bangladesh in 2017.

In an interview with Sangbad Chitra published from Dhaka in August 1992, Hasan opined that the Indemnity Ordinance, 1975 was beyond the constitutional powers of Parliament. He also asserted that the murderers of Sheikh Mujibur Rahman and his family should be brought to justice. He has been contributing articles in the leading English and vernacular journals and newspapers since 1990.

Hasan removed eight members from the board of directors of Pubali Bank on 26 February 2014 as the directors did not own the minimum required shares of the bank.

On 5 August 2016, Hasan and Justice Kashefa Hussain ordered Chittagong Development Authority, Chattogram City Corporation, and the Department of Environment to protect Munshi Pukur in Chittagong. On 16 August 2016, Hasan and Justice Kashefa Hussain ordered the removal of 2,181 illegal structures from the banks of Karnaphuli River.

References 

Living people
1962 births
University of Dhaka alumni
20th-century Bangladeshi lawyers
Supreme Court of Bangladesh justices
21st-century Bangladeshi judges